Kaspichan Point (Nos Kaspichan \'nos 'ka-spi-chan\) is a point on the southeast side of the entrance to Kramolin Cove on the southwest coast of Greenwich Island, Antarctica.  Situated next west of Hebrizelm Hill, 1.4 km northwest of Triangle Point, 2 km south-southwest of Tile Ridge, and 2 km southeast of Yovkov Point.  Shape enhanced by recent glacier retreat northwest of the point.  Bulgarian topographic survey Tangra 2004/05.  Named after the town of Kaspichan in northeastern Bulgaria.

See also
 Kaspichan

Maps
 L.L. Ivanov et al. Antarctica: Livingston Island and Greenwich Island, South Shetland Islands. Scale 1:100000 topographic map. Sofia: Antarctic Place-names Commission of Bulgaria, 2005.
 L.L. Ivanov. Antarctica: Livingston Island and Greenwich, Robert, Snow and Smith Islands. Scale 1:120000 topographic map.  Troyan: Manfred Wörner Foundation, 2009.

References
 Kaspichan Point. SCAR Composite Gazetteer of Antarctica
 Bulgarian Antarctic Gazetteer. Antarctic Place-names Commission. (details in Bulgarian, basic data in English)

External links
 Kaspichan Point. Copernix satellite image

Headlands of Greenwich Island
Bulgaria and the Antarctic